This is a list of the members of the Dewan Rakyat (House of Representatives) of the 4th Parliament of Malaysia, elected in 1974.

Composition

Elected members by state


Unless noted otherwise, the MPs served the entire term of the parliament (from 4 November 1974 until 12 June 1978).

Perlis

Kedah

Kelantan

Trengganu

Penang

Perak

Pahang

Selangor

Federal Territory of Kuala Lumpur

Negri Sembilan

Malacca

Johore

Sabah

Sarawak

Notes

References

Abdullah, Z. G., Adnan, H. N., & Lee, K. H. (1997). Malaysia, tokoh dulu dan kini = Malaysian personalities, past and present. Kuala Lumpur, Malaysia: Penerbit Universiti Malaya.
Anzagain Sdn. Bhd. (2004). Almanak keputusan pilihan raya umum: Parlimen & Dewan Undangan Negeri, 1959-1999. Shah Alam, Selangor: Anzagain.
Chin, U.-H. (1996). Chinese politics in Sarawak: A study of the Sarawak United People's Party. Kuala Lumpur: Oxford University Press.
Faisal, S. H. (2012). Domination and Contestation: Muslim Bumiputera Politics in Sarawak. Institute of Southeast Asian Studies.
Hussain, M. (1987). Membangun demokrasi: Pilihanraya di Malaysia. Kuala Lumpur: Karya Bistari.
Ibnu, H. (1993). PAS kuasai Malaysia?: 1950-2000 sejarah kebangkitan dan masa depan. Kuala Lumpur: GG Edar.
Suruhanjaya Pilihanraya Malaysia. (1975). Penyata pilihanraya umum Dewan Rakyat dan Dewan Undangan Negeri bagi negeri-negeri Tanah Melayu dan Sarawak, tahun 1974. Kuala Lumpur: Jabatan Cetak Kerajaan.

Malaysian parliaments
Lists of members of the Dewan Rakyat